Elmer Wayne Henley Jr. (born May 9, 1956) is a convicted American serial killer and painter incarcerated in the Texas Department of Criminal Justice (TDCJ) system. Henley was convicted in 1974 for his role as a participant in a series of murders known colloquially as the Houston Mass Murders in which a minimum of 28 teenage boys and young men were abducted, tortured, raped and murdered by Dean Corll between 1970 and 1973. Henley and David Owen Brooks (Corll's other teenage accomplice), together and individually, lured many of the victims to Corll's home. Henley, then 17 years old, shot Corll dead on August 8, 1973.

Henley is serving six consecutive terms of 99 years for his involvement in the Houston Mass Murders, which at the time were characterized as "the deadliest case of serial murders in American history". As a result of Henley killing Corll and Brooks dying in prison in 2020 from COVID-19, Henley is the only one of the trio still alive.

Early life 
Henley was born May 9, 1956, in Houston, Texas, the eldest of four sons born to Elmer Wayne Henley Sr. (September 21, 1938 – June 18, 1986) and Mary Pauline Henley (née Weed) (born May 4, 1937). His father was an alcoholic who physically assaulted his wife and sons. Despite the abuse, Mary Henley tried to ensure that her children received a good education and stayed out of trouble. The couple divorced in 1970 when Henley was 14. Henley's mother—who worked as a cashier at a parking lot—retained custody of her four sons.

Initially, Henley was an excellent student at school; but after his parents' divorce he took a series of menial part-time jobs to help his mother with household finances, and his grades dropped sharply. At the age of 15, Henley dropped out of high school. He would later develop a minor criminal record, being arrested for assault with a deadly weapon in 1971 and burglary one year later.

Prior to his leaving high school, Henley became acquainted with a youth one year his senior named David Brooks. The two became friends and often played truant together. Through his acquaintance with Brooks, Henley became aware that his friend spent a lot of his free time in the company of an older man with whom he himself gradually became a casual acquaintance: Dean Corll. Initially, Henley was oblivious to the true extent of Corll's and Brooks' relationship. He later stated that though he admired Corll because he worked hard, he also suspected that Corll was homosexual, and concluded that Brooks was "hustling himself a queer."

Nonetheless, in late 1971, Henley also began spending time in Corll's company. Corll told Henley that he was involved in organized theft, and he, Brooks and Henley burgled several addresses, for which Henley was paid small sums of money. On one occasion, in an apparent test of character, Corll asked Henley if he would be willing to kill if required, to which Henley replied, "Yes."

The same year, Henley became aware of an insidious pattern of disappearances in his neighborhood: since the previous December, a minimum of eight boys ages 13 to 17 had disappeared from Houston Heights. Henley was friends with two of the youths, David Hilligiest and Gregory Malley Winkle, who had disappeared on May 29, 1971, on their way to a local swimming pool. Henley himself had actively participated in the search for them.

Introduction to Dean Corll 
In the winter of 1971, when he was 15, Wayne Henley was again taken by David Brooks to meet Corll. In his confession given almost two years later, Henley told detectives Brooks lured him to Corll's home on the promise he could participate in "a deal where I could make some money." At Corll's home (where he was possibly taken as an intended victim), the youth was told by Corll that he belonged to an organization based in Dallas which recruited young boys for a child sex slavery ring. Henley was offered the same fee as Brooks ($200) for any boy whom he could bring to Corll.

Henley later told police that he ignored Corll's offer for several months. However, in early 1972, he decided he would "help find a boy" for Corll, as he was in dire financial circumstances. At Corll's home, Corll and Henley devised a ruse in which they would lure a youth to Corll's home and Henley would then cuff his hands behind his back, release himself, then con the victim into placing the handcuffs upon himself. The pair then drove around Houston Heights and, at the corner of 11th and Studewood, Henley persuaded a youth to enter Corll's Plymouth GTX. Henley would lure the victim to Corll's Schuler Street apartment on the promise of smoking some marijuana. At Corll's address, Henley helped con the teenager into donning the handcuffs, then watched Corll pounce on the youth, tie his feet and place tape over his mouth. Henley then left the youth alone with Corll, believing he was to be sold into the sex slavery ring. The next day, Corll paid Henley $200.

The identity of this first victim Henley assisted in the abduction of remains unknown.

Participation in killings 
On March 24, Henley, in the company of Corll and Brooks, persuaded an 18-year-old friend of his named Frank Aguirre to accompany him to Corll's home on the promise of smoking marijuana with the trio. At Corll's home, Aguirre was supplied with marijuana, then persuaded to handcuff himself. Corll dragged Aguirre to his bedroom and secured him to his torture board where he was raped, tortured and strangled before being buried at High Island Beach. Henley later claimed that he attempted to talk Corll out of raping and killing Aguirre, but Corll adamantly refused. At this point, Corll told him the youth he had previously assisted in the abduction of had been killed and that Aguirre was to suffer the same fate. Corll rented a boat shed on Silver Bell Street in southwest Houston (where police eventually found eight bodies)  Later, Corll and Brooks told Henley that his childhood friend, David Hilligiest, had also been killed and buried in that same boat shed along with his swimming companion Gregory Malley Winkle.

Despite the revelations to the reality of the fate of the boys brought to Corll, Henley nonetheless continued to assist Corll and Brooks in the abductions and murders of youths, who would be lured to Corll's home either alone or in pairs. Less than one month later, Henley and Brooks persuaded another friend of theirs, 17-year-old Mark Scott, to attend a party at Corll's home. As had been the case with Frank Aguirre, Scott was raped, tortured, strangled and buried at High Island Beach before another two Heights youths, Billy Gene Baulch Jr. and Johnny Ray Delome, were also murdered and buried at High Island on May 21.

Corll moved to an address at Westcott Towers in June 1972 and within one month, a 17-year-old youth named Steven Sickman had been murdered. On October 3, Henley assisted Corll in the abduction and murder of two Heights boys named Wally Simoneaux and Richard Hembree. David Brooks later stated Hembree was accidentally shot in the mouth by Henley who, according to Brooks' confession "just came in (the room where the two boys were bound) waving the .22 and accidentally shot one of the boys in the jaw." The two boys were killed by strangulation later the same day. Both were later buried in the boat shed. Sometime in the following month, an 18-year-old named Willard Karmon Branch Jr. was emasculated and shot before his body was buried in Corll's boat shed. The same month, a 19-year-old named Richard Kepner was abducted while walking to phone his fiancée from a pay phone.

By the time Richard Kepner had been killed and buried at High Island, Henley had assisted in the abduction and murder of a minimum of nine teenage boys. On February 1, 1973, Corll abducted and killed a 17-year-old youth named Joseph Lyles, apparently without the assistance of Henley, who had temporarily moved to Mount Pleasant in early 1973.

In the spring of 1973, Henley attempted to enlist in the U.S. Navy, but his application was rejected on June 28 due to the fact he had dropped out of high school and—although a later intelligence test would reveal his IQ to be 126—possessed a limited education. In a 2010 interview, Henley stated: "I couldn't leave anyway. If I did go, I knew Dean would go after one of my little brothers, who he always liked a little too much."

Nonetheless, between June and July 1973: Henley, Brooks and Corll killed a further seven victims between the ages of fifteen and twenty, at least five of whom Henley participated in either the abduction or murder.

On June 4, a 15-year-old friend of Henley's named Billy Lawrence was abducted and, after 3 days of abuse and torture at an address Corll had moved to in Pasadena, strangled with a ligature and buried at Lake Sam Rayburn.

Less than two weeks later, a 20-year-old hitchhiker named Raymond Blackburn was likewise strangled and buried at Lake Sam Rayburn before a 15-year-old South Houston youth named Homer Garcia was shot and buried at the same location after his July 7 abduction. Two additional youths, John Sellars and Michael Baulch, were killed on July 12 and 19. 15-year-old Michael Baulch was the younger brother of Billy Gene Baulch Jr., who was murdered the previous spring. On July 25, Henley lured two friends of his named Charles Cobble and Marty Jones to Corll's apartment where, two days later, Cobble was shot and Jones strangled before the youths were buried in Corll's boat shed.

On August 3, Brooks and Corll – without the assistance of Henley – abducted and killed a 13-year-old boy named James Dreymala. Dreymala was strapped to Corll's torture board, raped, tortured & strangled before being buried in Corll's boat shed.

August 8 party 
On August 8, 1973, Henley brought a further potential victim, 19-year-old Timothy Kerley, to Corll's home upon the promise of a party. Before Corll was able to manacle Kerley to his torture board, the pair left Corll's home to purchase sandwiches. Henley and Kerley later returned to Corll's home – in the company of a 15-year-old girl named Rhonda Williams. Corll was furious that a girl had been brought to his house, telling Henley in private he had "ruined everything." Externally, however, Corll remained calm: he waited until Henley and the other two teenagers fell asleep from a night of drinking and smoking marijuana before binding and gagging them.

Henley woke to find Corll placing handcuffs upon his wrists, Kerley and Williams had each been bound and gagged and lay alongside Henley on the floor.

Corll then dragged Henley by his cuffed hands into his kitchen and placed a .22 caliber pistol against his stomach, threatening to shoot him. Henley pleaded for his life, promising to participate in the torture and murder of the other youths if Corll released him. Corll agreed and untied Henley, then carried Kerley and Williams into his bedroom and tied them to opposite sides of his plywood torture board: Kerley on his stomach; Williams on her back.

Henley was handed a long hunting knife by Corll, who ordered him to cut away Williams' clothes, insisting that he would rape and kill the youth as Henley would do likewise to Rhonda Williams. Henley began cutting away the girl's clothes as Corll placed the pistol upon a table, undressed and climbed on top of Kerley.

Shooting of Corll 
As Corll began to assault and torture Tim Kerley, Henley began to cut away Williams' clothes with the knife Corll had handed him. As he did so, Williams lifted her head and asked Henley, "Is this for real?" Henley replied in the affirmative and Williams then asked Henley whether he intended to "do anything about it," upon which Henley grabbed the pistol Corll had laid on a bedside table and ordered Corll to stop what he was doing, shouting, "You've gone far enough, Dean!"

Even with a weapon pointed at him, Corll was not cowed: he walked towards Henley, shouting, "Kill me, Wayne! You won't do it!" Henley fired a round at Corll, hitting him in the forehead. As Corll continued to advance upon him, Henley shot him a further two times in the shoulder, upon which Corll staggered out of the room where the teenagers were held. Henley then fired a further three rounds into the rear of his right shoulder and upper back, killing him. He then released Kerley and Williams, phoned the Pasadena police and subsequently confessed to his role in the Houston Mass Murders.

Confession 
On the evening of August 8, Henley confessed to police that for almost three years, he and David Brooks had helped procure teenage boys – some of whom had been their own friends – for Dean Corll. Henley unequivocally stated that since the winter of 1971, he had actively participated in the abductions and, later, the murders of the victims. He stated that Brooks had also been an active accomplice – albeit for a longer period of time than he.

Henley stated to police that Corll had paid him and Brooks $200 for each victim they were able to lure to his apartment, and informed police that Corll had buried most of his victims in a boatshed in Southwest Houston, and others at Lake Sam Rayburn and High Island Beach. He agreed to accompany police to each of the burial sites to assist in the recovery of the victims.

In one of the more dramatic moments in Houston television history, Jack Cato, a reporter for Houston's NBC television affiliate KPRC-TV, accompanied Henley and police as Henley led them to the storage shed where he and Corll had buried some of the murder victims' bodies. Cato allowed Henley the use of his mobile radio telephone to call Henley's mother, at which time Henley blurted the words, "Mama, I killed Dean," into the receiver, confessing to her that he had killed Dean Corll, all while Cato was capturing the conversation on film. The footage played several times on KPRC-TV's local news and was picked up for nationwide broadcast by NBC Nightly News that evening.

Between August 8 and 13, 1973, a total of 27 boys between the ages of 13 and 20 were found buried at the three locations Henley (and later, Brooks) had stated they and Corll had buried the victims, with an additional victim being discovered in 1983. Seventeen of the victims were found buried in the boat shed, a further four victims were found at Lake Sam Rayburn, six bodies were found buried at High Island Beach (although the body of a seventh victim buried at High Island, Mark Scott, still lies undiscovered at this location) and the body of a 28th victim was found buried at Jefferson County Beach in August 1983.

All the victims found were young males and many had been sexually tortured in addition to being sexually assaulted. Autopsies revealed each victim had been killed by either strangulation, shooting or a combination of both.

At Henley's trial in 1974, one of the six bodies found buried at High Island, that of 17-year-old John Manning Sellars, was disputed as being a victim of Corll by a forensic pathologist who examined his remains. The youth, who vanished on July 12, 1973, had died of four gunshot wounds fired from a rifle, whereas each other victim of the Houston Mass Murders had either been strangled or killed with the .22 caliber pistol Henley had used to kill Dean Corll. However, Henley and Brooks had led police to Sellars' body on August 13, 1973, and the youth's body was found bound hand and foot and buried in a manner similar to Corll's other known victims.

Indictment 
On August 13, 1973, a grand jury convened in Harris County to hear evidence against Henley and Brooks. The jury heard evidence from both Rhonda Williams and Tim Kerley, who each testified to the events of August 7 and 8 leading to the shooting of Dean Corll, plus the testimony from various police officers who recited and discussed the written statements each youth had made and described how both Brooks and Henley had led them to each of the burial sites. The assembled jury also heard the testimony of a youth named Billy Ridinger, who had been abducted by Corll, Henley and Brooks in 1972 and who testified as to his torture and abuse at the hands of the trio.

After listening to the evidence presented, the jury initially indicted Henley on three counts of murder and Brooks on one count. Bail was set at $100,000. Henley was not charged with the death of Dean Corll, which was ruled self-defense.

On October 8, Henley and Brooks were brought to court to face a formal arraignment. Henley was charged with six counts of murder and Brooks with four counts. Both youths pleaded not guilty to the charges against them.

Trial and conviction 
Henley was brought to trial in San Antonio in July 1974, charged with the murders of six teenage boys whom he himself had lured to Corll's apartment between March 1972 and July 1973. Throughout his trial, Henley was represented by Will Gray and Edwin Pegelow.

The State of Texas presented a total of 82 pieces of evidence throughout Henley's trial, including the written confession Henley had given on August 8, which was read to the court in which he admitted killing or assisting in the abduction and murder of several youths, including the 6 teenagers for whose murder he was on trial. Other pieces of evidence presented included the wooden box used to transport the victims' bodies to the various burial sites and the plywood body board upon which many victims had been restrained. Within the wooden box, investigators had found several strands of human hair which examiners had concluded came from Charles Cobble. A total of 25 witnesses testified as to Henley's involvement in the abductions and murders, including Detective David Mullican. At one point during the trial, Mullican testified that Henley had informed him that in order to restrain the youths; he, Brooks and Corll had "handcuffed (the victims) to the board and sometimes to a wall with their mouths taped so they couldn't make any noise".

Following advice from his defense counsel, Henley did not take the stand to testify in his own defense, although one of his attorneys, Will Gray, did cross examine a number of witnesses. On more than 300 occasions, Henley's attorneys raised objections to the testimony given or evidence presented against Henley which was overruled by the judge presiding at his trial.

On July 16, 1974, after hearing closing arguments from both prosecution and defense, the jury retired to consider their verdict. After one hour of deliberation they reached their conclusion: Henley was found guilty and sentenced to six consecutive 99-year terms of imprisonment. On July 25, Henley and his attorneys filed an appeal, contending that Henley had been denied an evidentiary hearing; that the jury had not been sequestered; that a motion to move the initial trial away from San Antonio had also been denied and that the presence of news media in the courtroom had also prejudiced his trial.

Appeal 
Henley's conviction was overturned on appeal on December 20, 1978.  He was tried for a second time in June 1979 and was again convicted of six murders and again sentenced to six life terms although to run concurrently rather than consecutively.

Elmer Wayne Henley first became eligible for parole on July 8, 1980; on this occasion—and each successive parole hearing to date—he has been denied parole. Henley's next eligible parole date is October 2025 when he will be 69 years old.

Henley is incarcerated in the Stiles Unit in Jefferson County.

David Brooks 
David Brooks was tried for the June 1973 murder of Billy Ray Lawrence in February 1975. He was convicted and sentenced to life imprisonment on March 4. Brooks died of COVID-19 complications in May 2020.

Art controversy 
In 1994, at the suggestion of a Louisiana art dealer, Henley began to paint as a hobby, in part as a means of generating income for himself and his mother.

In interviews, Henley has stated that he suffers from a severe color deficiency in his eyesight that makes it impossible for him to clearly distinguish between reds and greens. To compensate, any people Henley paints are in black and white while his other works are usually in color. Henley refuses to paint or draw any images of a violent or exploitative nature: many of his works depict serene imagery such as landscapes, buildings and flowers and the majority being created using acrylics and graphite.

A pen pal with whom Henley has corresponded has also organized several exhibitions of his artwork. In 1997, the Hyde Park Gallery in Houston's Neartown area hosted Henley's first art show. This exhibition drew outrage from some victims' relatives. In 1999 the city of Houston expressed interest in building a monument to victims of violent crime, which Henley said he would be willing to help pay for with part of the proceeds from a second art show.

Media

Film 
 A film loosely inspired by the Houston Mass Murders, Freak Out, was released in 2003.
 Production of a film directly based upon the Houston Mass Murders, In a Madman's World, finished in 2014. Directed by Josh Vargas, In a Madman's World is directly based upon Elmer Wayne Henley's life before, during, and immediately after his involvement with Dean Corll and David Brooks. Limited edition copies of the film were released in 2017.

Bibliography 
 Christian, Kimberly (2015). Horror in the Heights: The True Story of The Houston Mass Murders. CreateSpace. .
 Gurwell, John K. (1974). Mass Murder in Houston. Cordovan Press.
 Hanna, David (1975). Harvest of Horror: Mass Murder in Houston. Belmont Tower.
 
 Rosewood, Jack (2015). Dean Corll: The True Story of The Houston Mass Murders. CreateSpace .

Television 
 A 1982 documentary, The Killing of America, features a section devoted to the Houston Mass Murders.
 FactualTV host a documentary focusing upon the murders committed by Corll and his accomplices. Dr. Sharon Derrick is among those interviewed for the documentary.
 The Investigation Discovery channel has broadcast a documentary focusing upon the Houston Mass Murders within their documentary series, Most Evil. This documentary, entitled "Manipulators", was first broadcast in December 2014.
 Episode 4 of Season 2 of the 2017 Netflix series Mindhunter follows a storyline involving interviews with Henley (portrayed by Robert Aramayo), centered around his involvement with Corll and the Houston Mass Murders.

Music 
 Australian band The Mark of Cain included a sample of Henley's confession to his mother over the phone on their 1989 album Battlesick; it is at the start of the song "You Are Alone."

See also 
 List of serial killers in the United States
 List of serial killers by number of victims

Notes

References

External links 
 Contemporary news article pertaining to Elmer Wayne Henley's 1974 trial
 Contemporary news article pertaining to Elmer Wayne Henley's initial 1974 conviction
 
 Elmer Wayne Henley, Jr. vs. The State of Texas: Full transcript of Henley's 1978 appeal against his 1974 convictions
  in the case of Elmer Wayne Henley
 TDCJ Online Offender Search

1956 births
1972 murders in the United States
20th-century American criminals
American male criminals
American murderers of children
American prisoners sentenced to life imprisonment
American serial killers
Criminals from Texas
Living people
Male serial killers
People from Houston
Prisoners sentenced to life imprisonment by Texas
Violence against men in North America